Xi Sculptoris, Latinized from ξ Sculptoris, is a solitary orange-hued star in the southern constellation of Sculptor, near the southern constellation boundary with Phoenix. It is just visible to the naked eye as a dim point of light with an apparent visual magnitude of 5.59. The distance to Xi Sculptoris is approximately 489 light years based on parallax, while it is drifting closer with a radial velocity of −31 km/s. It has an absolute magnitude of −0.39.

This object is an aging giant star with a stellar classification of K1 III, which indicates it has exhausted the supply of hydrogen at its core then expanded and cooled off the main sequence. At present it has 22 times the girth of the Sun. It is radiating 182 times the luminosity of the Sun from its swollen photosphere at an effective temperature of 4,489 K.

References

K-type giants
Sculptor (constellation)
Sculptoris, Xi
Durchmusterung objects
006055
004770
0288